Arctostaphylos obispoensis is a species of manzanita, known by the common names bishop manzanita and serpentine manzanita,  endemic to California.

Distribution
The plant is endemic to the southern Santa Lucia Mountains, in the Central Coast region of California.  It is found primarily in San Luis Obispo County, and extends into southern Monterey County.

It grows in chaparral and closed-cone pine forest habitats, usually on serpentine soil.

Conservation
It is protected within the Cuesta Ridge Botanical Special Interest Area of the Los Padres National Forest, growing in the endemic Sargent cypress (Cupressus sargentii) forest. The species is listed on the California Native Plant Society Inventory of Rare and Endangered Plants as a rare but not currently endangered species.

Description

The small branches and newer leaves are woolly. The mature leaves are glaucous-gray, hairless, and oblong (northern range) to widely lance-shaped (southern range), and up to 4.5 centimeters long.

The inflorescence is a dense cluster of white urn-shaped and downward facing "manzanita" flowers.

The red fruit is a round waxy drupe,  in diameter.

See also
Arctostaphylos luciana — range adjacent on west side of Cuesta Ridge
Arctostaphylos pilosula — range adjacent on east side of Cuesta Ridge

References

External links
Calflora Database: Arctostaphylos obispoensis (Bishop manzanita,  Serpentine manzanita)
Jepson Manual eFlora (TJM2) treatment of Arctostaphylos obispoensis
USDA Plants Profile for Arctostaphylos obispoensis (serpentine manzanita)
UC Photos gallery — Arctostaphylos obispoensis

obispoensis
Endemic flora of California
Natural history of the California chaparral and woodlands
Natural history of the California Coast Ranges
~
~
Natural history of Monterey County, California
Natural history of San Luis Obispo County, California
Plants described in 1937